Hush is the third studio album by American shoegaze band Asobi Seksu. It was released on February 17, 2009 by Polyvinyl Record Co., marking the band's first album for the label. Hush was recorded in the summer of 2008 and was produced by Chris Zane, who had also worked on Asobi Seksu's previous album Citrus (2006). The album demonstrated a shift from the more shoegaze-inspired work of prior releases to a mellower, quieter sound.

Hush produced four singles: "Me & Mary", released on November 17, 2008; "Familiar Light", released on February 16, 2009; "Transparence", released on August 21, 2009; and "Layers", released on December 7, 2009.

In popular culture
The song "Layers" was featured in the episode "The Born Identity" of the third season of the TV series Ugly Betty.

Track listing

Credits
Credits are adapted from the album's liner notes.

Asobi Seksu
 Yuki Chikudate – vocals, synthesizer, organ
 James Hanna – bass, guitar, synthesizer, vocals
 Gunnar Olsen – drums

Additional musicians
 Devon Maxwell – percussion
 George Pagonis – percussion
 Chris Zane – percussion

Production
 Alex Aldi – engineering
 Greg Calbi – mastering
 Chris Zane – production, mixing

Design
 Sean McCabe – art direction, design, photography

Charts

References

External links
 
 

2009 albums
Asobi Seksu albums
Polyvinyl Record Co. albums